The Supreme Soviet of the Azerbaijan SSR (Azerbaijani: Азәрбаjҹан ССР Али Совети, Azərbaycan SSR Ali Soveti; Russian: Верховный Совет Азербайджа́нской ССР tr. Verkhovnyy Sovet Azerbaydzhanskoy SSR) was the supreme soviet (main legislative institution) of the Azerbaijan SSR. In 1994, the Supreme Soviet was renamed to the National Assembly and was officially disbanded in 1995 when a semi-presidential system was implemented.

History
During the last session of Azerbaijani Parliament on April 27, 1920 under pressure of the Bolshevik Russian 11th Red Army and ultimatum from Caucasian Committee of the Russian Communist Party which invaded Azerbaijan, the deputies decided to disband the government in favour of the Bolsheviks to avoid bloodshed.
Once the Bolsheviks took over, they abolished all structures of the Azerbaijani government and established the Azerbaijan Interim Revolutionary Committee administered by Azerbaijani communists Nariman Narimanov, Aliheydar Garayev, Gazanfar Musabekov, Hamid Sultanov and Dadash Bunyadzade. The Bolsheviks dissolved the Azerbaijani Army, executed its generals and officers, and nationalized private industries.

In May 1921, the first All-Azerbaijan Soviet Session made up of newly elected deputies from all regions of Azerbaijan convened in Baku. The elected deputies were mainly drawn from poor, uneducated, unprepared factory workers and villagers which facilitated complete rule from Moscow. The first session established the Azerbaijan Central Executive Committee consisting of 75 members and its board with 13 members. From 1921 through 1937, nine sessions of All-Azerbaijan Soviets were convened.
In 1937, during the 9th session of the All-Azerbaijani Soviets a new Azerbaijan SSR Constitution was ratified and the new legislative body the Supreme Soviet of Azerbaijan SSR was established.

The first elections to Supreme Soviet took place on June 24, 1938. Out of 310 deputies elected, 107 were workers, 88 collective farmers and 115 educated civil servants. Seventy two of the deputies were women. Due to the authoritarian nature of Soviet rule where most new initiatives were met with hostility, the parliament was virtually ineffective.
Due to multiple reforms and restructuring in the government of the Azerbaijan SSR in the 1970s-1980s, the role of the Supreme Soviet increased. Many legislative reforms including the ratification of the new Azerbaijan SSR Constitution of 1977 took place. After the demands of the Armenian SSR to transfer the NKAO region of Azerbaijan to Armenia, the parliament was largely passive and indifferent.
On October 18, 1991 the Supreme Soviet passed a resolution confirming the restoration of the independence of Azerbaijan.

Convocations 

 1st Convocation (1938-1946)
 2nd Convocation (1947-1950)
 3rd Convocation (1951-1954)
 4th Convocation (1955-1959)
 5th Convocation (1959-1962)
 6th Convocation (1963-1966)
 7th Convocation (1967-1970)
 8th Convocation (1971-1975)
 9th Convocation (1975-1979)
 10th Convocation (1980-1984)
 11th Convocation (1985-1990)
 12th Convocation (1991-1995)

Chairmen of the Supreme Soviet 
In May 1990, the Presidium of the Supreme Soviet of the Azerbaijan SSR was disbanded. As a result, the powers within the position of the Chairman of the Presidium of the Supreme Soviet were transferred to the Chairman of the Supreme Soviet.

Chairmen of the Presidium of the Supreme Soviet

See also 

 Supreme Soviet of the Soviet Union
 Supreme Soviet
 Azerbaijan SSR

References 

Historical legislatures
1938 establishments in Azerbaijan
1995 disestablishments in Azerbaijan
Government of the Soviet Union
Government of Azerbaijan
Azerbaijan Soviet Socialist Republic
Defunct unicameral legislatures
Azerbaijan